One Piece: Grand Adventure is a video game for the PlayStation 2 and the GameCube based on the popular anime and manga series, One Piece. It was created as a sequel to One Piece: Grand Battle! and its gameplay remains mostly unchanged. Grand Adventure adds more characters, levels, and features. The game was released exclusively for North America, Europe, Australia and Korea.

Gameplay
The main mode of Grand Adventure is  Adventure Mode, in which the player must beat 10 levels to complete an adventure. The player uses the Going Merry to sail the Grand Line and visit various islands. On these islands, the player will engage in combat against other characters. Characters defeated this way may join your character's crew, or play in various mini-games. Characters gain experience points by being used and can level up, increasing certain stats of the character (HP, attack, defense, etc.).

Reception

The game was met with average reception upon release.  GameRankings and Metacritic gave it a score of 74% and 70 out of 100 for the GameCube version, and 68% and 66 out of 100 for the PlayStation 2 version.

References

External links
 

2006 video games
Fighting games
GameCube games
Ganbarion games
Multiplayer and single-player video games
Grand Adventure
PlayStation 2 games
Video games developed in Japan